Alvin Sims (born October 18, 1974) is an American former professional basketball player. Sims played with the Phoenix Suns in the National Basketball Association (NBA), during the 1998–99 season.

College career
Sims, a 6'4" (1.93 m) tall shooting guard, attended Paris High School, in Paris, Kentucky, where he played high school basketball. After high school, Sims played college basketball at the University of Louisville. He played with the school's men's team, the Louisville Cardinals, from 1993 to 1997. In his junior season, he averaged 11.9 points per game.

Professional career
Sims began his pro club career in the Continental Basketball Association (CBA), with the Quad City Thunder. With the Thunder, he was voted the 1998 CBA Rookie of the Year. Sims earned a spot with the Phoenix Suns of the NBA, but he was released in May 1999. In four games played with the Suns, he scored a total of 11 points.

Sims also played professionally in Venezuela, Greece, Italy, France, the UK, Lebanon, Austria, Iran, and Cyprus.

References

External links
NBA.com Profile
Basketball-Reference.com Profile
Euroleague.net Profile
FIBA Europe Profile
RealGM.com Profile
ProBallers.com Profile
Eurobasket.com Profile

1974 births
Living people
21st-century African-American sportspeople
20th-century African-American sportspeople
African-American basketball players
American expatriate basketball people in Cyprus
American expatriate basketball people in France
American expatriate basketball people in Greece
American expatriate basketball people in Iran
American expatriate basketball people in Italy
American expatriate basketball people in Lebanon
American expatriate basketball people in the United Kingdom
American expatriate basketball people in Venezuela
American men's basketball players
Anibal Zahle basketball players
Basketball players from Chicago
BSC Fürstenfeld Panthers players
Élan Béarnais players
Greek Basket League players
Leicester Riders players
Louisville Cardinals men's basketball players
Makedonikos B.C. players
Pallacanestro Reggiana players
Pallacanestro Trieste players
Panionios B.C. players
Phoenix Suns players
Quad City Thunder players
Roseto Sharks players
Sagesse SC basketball players
Shooting guards
SIG Basket players
Small forwards
Undrafted National Basketball Association players
United States Basketball League players